Andrew Robert Ford (born 20 September 1963) is a former Bahamian cricketer. Ford is a right-handed batsman who bowls right-arm medium pace. He represented the Bahamas national cricket team in 20 matches.

Ford made his debut for the Bahamas in the 2004 Americas Affiliates Championship against the Turks and Caicos Islands.	

Ford made his Twenty20 debut for the Bahamas in the 1st round of the 2008 Stanford 20/20 against Jamaica.

Ford represented the Bahamas in the 2008 ICC World Cricket League Division Five, with his final appearance for the team coming against Vanuatu.

References

External links
Andrew Ford at Cricinfo
Andrew Ford at CricketArchive

1963 births
Living people
Bahamian cricketers